Mortimer J. Scanlan  (March 18, 1861 – December 29, 1928) was an American first baseman in Major League Baseball. He played three games for the New York Giants of the National League on April 21, 22, and 23, 1890.

External links

1861 births
1928 deaths
19th-century baseball players
Major League Baseball first basemen
New York Giants (NL) players
Chicago Whitings players
Baseball players from Chicago